Israel competed at the 1972 Summer Olympics in Munich, West Germany, which began on August 26. On September 5 and 6, in the Munich massacre, 11 members of the Israeli delegation—5 athletes, 2 referees, and 4 coaches (names bolded on this page)—were taken hostage by Palestine Liberation Organization terrorists and murdered.  The remainder of the team left Munich on September 7.

Shaul Ladany, a Holocaust survivor, competed in the 50-kilometer walk. He had been imprisoned in Bergen-Belsen concentration camp as a child, and wore a Star of David on his warm-up jersey. When he was congratulated by locals on his fluent German, he responded:  "I learned it in Bergen-Belsen". He survived the Munich massacre by jumping off a balcony.

Results

Referees
The following nominated referees and judges were in the delegation:
 Yossef Gutfreund — wrestling
 Yakov Springer – weightlifting

Coaches and officials
The following coaches and officials were in the delegation:
 Shmuel Lalkin — Chef De Mission
 Micha Shamban — presumably deputy of Chef De Mission
 Eliyahu Friedlender - sailing team manager
 Amitzur Shapira — athletics coach
 Kehat Shorr — shooting coach
 Tuvia Sokolovsky — weightlifting coach
 Andre Spitzer — fencing coach
 Moshe Weinberg — wrestling coach
 Itzhac Aldubi - chairman of ASA (Academic Sport Association)
 Werner Nachmann
 Duel Parrack
 Josef Szwec
 Kurt Weigl

References

Nations at the 1972 Summer Olympics
1972 Summer Olympics
Summer Olympics
Munich massacre